Szigetszentmiklósi TK is a Hungarian football club located in Szigetszentmiklós, Hungary. It currently plays in Hungarian National Championship III. The team's colors are green and white.

External links 
  
 Soccerway

 
Football clubs in Hungary
Association football clubs established in 1922
1922 establishments in Hungary